Lake Lansing Park North is a public park in Haslett, Michigan covering about . The park entrance is located at 6260 East Lake Drive across from the Lake Lansing boat launch. There are several trails for hiking in the spring, summer and fall months, and cross country skiing in the winter.

According to the Ingham County Parks Department, roughly 450,000 people visit the Lake Lansing parks a year, with over 90% coming from the Lansing metropolitan area.

Facilities
In addition to the trails, Park North has picnic grounds, a softball diamond, horseshoe pits, volleyball and basketball courts, a cross country ski rental shop open during the winter, and two playgrounds. There are also three shelters constructed around the park that can be reserved for events. Depending on the shelter, they can hold between 60 and 240 people.

There are three full hiking and skiing trails and two cutoff trails that cover approximately  total according to the Ingham County Parks office. They are mostly wooded with a few boardwalks across marshy areas. Dogs must be on leash. On top of the current , a Michigan Department of Natural Resources grant is expected to acquire an additional  for Park North.

See also
List of lakes in Michigan
Lake Lansing Park South

References

External links
 Ingham County Parks
 Lake Lansing Property Owners Organization
 Lake Lansing Park North

Protected areas of Ingham County, Michigan
Lansing
Parks in Michigan
Bodies of water of Ingham County, Michigan